Henderson China Holdings is a large real estate developer in China and has Lee Shau Kee as its chairman and managing director since 1976.

See also
Real estate in China

References
HKUST - Genesis - Lee Shau Kee

Real estate companies of China
Henderson Land Development
Companies formerly listed on the Hong Kong Stock Exchange
1976 establishments in China